Marcos Yuri Gonçalves da Silva de Souza (born 28 June 1994), simply known as Yuri, is a Brazilian professional footballer who plays as a forward for Championnat National 2 club Saint-Priest.

Club career
Born in Teodoro Sampaio, São Paulo, Yuri joined Corinthians' youth setup in 2006, after starting it out at Santos. In 2013, he moved to Chapecoense, being assigned to the under-20s.

On 9 October 2014 Yuri made his first team – and Série A – debut, coming on as a second-half substitute for Tiago Luís in a 5–0 home routing over Internacional.

References

External links

Talent Sports profile 

1994 births
Living people
Footballers from São Paulo (state)
Brazilian footballers
Association football forwards
Campeonato Brasileiro Série A players
Campeonato Brasileiro Série D players
Campeonato Paranaense players
Championnat National 2 players
Championnat National 3 players
Santos FC players
Sport Club Corinthians Paulista players
Associação Chapecoense de Futebol players
Clube Atlético Metropolitano players

FC Cascavel players
FC Montceau Bourgogne players
AS Saint-Priest players
Brazilian expatriate footballers
Expatriate footballers in France
Brazilian expatriate sportspeople in France